The Luton DART is an airport rail link in Bedfordshire, England, which connects Luton Airport Parkway station and Luton Airport using a Cable Liner automated people mover system.  DART is an acronym for Direct Air-Rail Transit. The line replaces the shuttle bus service, with the aim of reducing road congestion and reducing journey times from London St Pancras to the airport terminal to 32minutes. Luton DART opened to passengers on 10 March 2023 with a limited service of four hours per day, and will eventually run 24 hours a day.

History

Background
From the 1950s and 1960s, Luton Airport experienced an increase in business as a result of the growing package holiday market. Although the Midland Main Line passed within  of the airport, there was no dedicated railway station and public transport connections to Luton Airport were limited. A shuttle bus service operated from Luton railway station, to convey rail passengers  from Luton town centre to the airport terminal.

Although the new station was closer to the airport ( to the west), it was still necessary to run a shuttle bus transfer service.

The shuttle bus was considered to be unsatisfactory, and proposals were developed to replace the bus service with a new rail link. Several schemes were considered, including a 2007 proposal to replace the shuttle buses with segregated tracked transit conveyors, and in 2015, a heavy rail spur link to the airport was also being considered. The steep incline from the airport — approximately  downhill to Luton Airport Parkway station — presented engineering challenges to building any heavy rail link over the short distance to the airport terminal. 

In April 2016,  London Luton Airport Ltd (LLAL) announced a scheme to create a light rail/automated guided people mover connection between the airport and Luton Airport Parkway station. It was envisaged that the introduction of a light-rail link would reduce the journey time between London St Pancras and the airport terminal to less than 30minutes.
At launch, that figure is 32minutes.

Construction

The  Luton DART link was approved by Luton Borough Council in June 2017. Construction work commenced in April 2018, contracted to a VolkerFitzpatrick / Kier Group joint venture.

The project involved construction of bridges over the A1081 road and tunnels, along with two stations in phase 1. The first station was built at Bartlett Square in Napier Park on the east side of Luton Airport Parkway station, and the final station at the airport. 
In 2018, it was announced that the system would be a Cable Liner, manufactured by the Austrian transit manufacturer, Doppelmayr Cable Car (DCC), who also have a contract to operate the system for the first five years. The vehicles will be built by the Austrian cabin manufacturer Carvatech.

In December 2019, a ready-constructed, -long, 1,000-tonne curved bridge was moved into place over the A1081 road on large jacks. Construction work on the line was halted briefly in April 2020 during the COVID-19 pandemic over concerns related to Coronavirus Health Protection Regulations, but resumed after a safety assessment. The cable propulsion system was completed in February 2020 and work then began to install the people mover vehicles on the guide rails. A new light rail terminus building has been constructed next to the railway station. The DART platforms are located on a new upper level above the current station, and are connected to the main-line rail platforms via a new footbridge, complete with lifts and escalators.

Testing of the transit vehicles began in 2021. In August of that year, reports emerged of problems experienced with the traction or the pulley system during testing, and that a DART vehicle had become derailed. This was denied by LLAL.

Opening
The system was originally scheduled to open in 2021. Following delays resulting from the COVID-19 pandemic, the opening date was revised to late 2022. The planned opening was later delayed due to further technical testing and development of the ticketing system.

On 6 December 2022, King Charles III visited the Luton DART terminal station during a royal visit to the town. He unveiled a plaque commemorating his visit before travelling on the new transit system.

Passenger trials began in February 2023, with a second batch of trials announced for March. The service opened to all passengers for four hours per day on 10 March. It is expected to open 24 hours per day three weeks later.

Route

The  DART line begins at Luton DART Parkway, a purpose-built station adjoining Luton Airport Parkway railway station, which provides an interchange with East Midlands Railway and Thameslink passenger rail services.

DART vehicles head south-eastwards along a  viaduct. After crossing the A1081 road, the vehicles curve eastwards along a  cutting and concrete trough before entering a 350-metre cut-and-cover tunnel under the airport apron. The eastern terminus is located at a new subterranean Central Terminal station underneath the drop-off area in front of the terminal building.

Operation
Luton DART is operated by a subsidiary company wholly owned by London Luton Airport Limited (LLAL, trading as Luton Rising). 

After the initial month of opening, the DART will run 24 hours a day.

The single fare for the DART is £4.90, with concessions for Luton residents, and free travel for holders of concessionary travel passes, disabled blue badge holders and airport workers. Rail tickets marked "Luton Airport" will include a ride on the DART.

Controversies
A member of Luton Borough Council's overview and scrutiny board called for an independent investigation into Luton DART's two year delay and £90 million budget increase.

The £4.90 DART fare has been criticised as too expensive for the short journey; at £3.95 per mile, the single fare compares unfavourably with the Heathrow Express and is the most expensive train in Britain by distance. The existing shuttle bus which has a fare of £2.40 single, with a return fare of £3.80 is due to be withdrawn.

Future extension
As part of the proposals for the expansion of Luton Airport, it is envisaged that the DART line would be extended eastwards to terminate at a new station serving Terminal 2.

References

External links
 
 Video simulation: 
 Mid-construction drone footage: 

Airport people mover systems in the United Kingdom
Railway lines in England
Transport in Luton/Dunstable Urban Area
Luton Airport

Cable Liner people movers
2023 in rail transport
Airport rail links in the United Kingdom